Bertman is a surname. Notable people with the surname include:

 Dmitry Bertman, Russian theatre and opera director
 Louisa Bertman, American illustrator
 Skip Bertman, former American baseball coach

See also
 Childs Bertman Tseckares Inc., an American architectural firm